Lichvaal Stereo (92.6FM) is a South African community radio station based in the North West.

Coverage areas 
Lichtenberg
Sannieshof
Biesiesvlei
Golingne
Mafikeng
Slurry Buhrmansdrift
Mmabatho
And 30 km into Botswana

Broadcast languages
Afrikaans

Broadcast time
18 hours a day (everyday), from 05:00 to 23:00

Target audience
Afrikaans community
LSM Groups 5 - 10
Age Group 15 - 50+

Programme format
60% Talk
40% Music

Listenership Figures

References

External links
 Official Website
 SAARF Website

Community radio stations in South Africa
Mass media in North West (South African province)